Northbay is a township and community in the north of Barra in the Outer Hebrides, off the west coast of Scotland. Northbay is within the parish of Barra.

There was a long history of settlement in the area - the neolithic standing stones at Borve testify to this. Once the Celts arrived here from Ulster, the island spent 800 years firmly under the stewardship of the MacNeil clan engaged in feudal agriculture and fishing. When Kisimul Castle was abandoned in 1795, the clan chief came to live at Eoligarry House and remained there until Colonel Cluny bought the island from the clan in 1838.

In 1939, a tarred road finally connected Northbay with Castlebay – formerly people either walked or used the sea to ship goods to the main port. Despite being a small island, communications were before this quite bad between the north and the south. The building of the road was largely the result of a campaign by Compton Mackenzie, author of Whisky Galore! who was quite well-connected.

References

External links

Canmore - Barra, North Bay, Bridge House site record
Canmore - Barra, North Bay site record

Ports and harbours of Scotland
Villages on Barra